Andorra competed at the 2015 Games of the Small States of Europe, in Reykjavík, Iceland from 1 to 6 June 2015.

Medalists 

|  style="text-align:left; width:78%; vertical-align:top;"|

|  style="text-align:left; width:22%; vertical-align:top;"|

Athletics

Men

Women

Basketball

Men's tournament

|}

Matches

Golf

Gymnastics

Individual

Team

Judo

Shooting

Swimming

Table Tennis

Tennis

Volleyball

Beach

References

Nations at the 2015 Games of the Small States of Europe
2015 in Andorran sport
Andorra at multi-sport events